Pennsylvania Route 718 (PA 718) is an  state highway located in Mercer County, Pennsylvania.  The southern terminus is at PA 318 in Shenango Township.  The northern terminus is the Ohio state line in South Pymatuning Township.

Route description

PA 718 begins at an intersection with PA 318 in Shenango Township, heading north on two-lane undivided Seig Hill Road. The road runs through wooded areas with some homes, passing under I-80. The route passes through agricultural areas prior to crossing the Shenango River into the borough of Wheatland. At this point, PA 718 becomes Council Street and heads through industrial areas, crossing Norfolk Southern's Wheatland Industrial Track railroad line. Farther north, PA 718 reaches an intersection with PA 418 and PA 760. At this intersection, PA 418 continues north along Council Street  and PA 718 turns west to form a concurrency with PA 760 on Broadway Road. The two routes pass residential areas to the north and industrial areas to the south with a few businesses. The road enters the city of Farrell and turns to the north, continuing to the west of developed neighborhoods and to the east of the Norfolk Southern railroad line as it passes more industry, including a large steel mill. PA 718/PA 760 crosses into the city of Sharon, where the road becomes Dock Street and passes under US 62, with a connection provided by local streets. From here, the road continues into downtown Sharon and reaches an intersection with US 62 Business.

At this junction, PA 760 ends and PA 718 makes a left turn to head west on US 62 Business. The two routes run along East State Street through the commercial downtown, crossing Norfolk Southern's Wheatland Industrial Track before heading across the Shenango River and becoming West State Street. PA 718 splits from US 62 Business by heading north along North Water Avenue. The road passes through industrial areas along the western bank of the Shenango River, crossing Norfolk Southern's Meadville Line. Farther north, the route passes homes to the west and riverside industry to the east, becoming the border between the city of Hermitage to the west and Sharon to the east. PA 718 fully enters Hermitage and heads through forested areas with a few homes, coming to an intersection with the southern terminus of PA 846. The route continues north from this point and enters South Pymatuning Township, where the road name becomes Ivanhoe Road. The road passes through more wooded areas of residences before heading into more agricultural surroundings. PA 718 turns northwest onto Tamarack Drive and passes through a mix of woods and farms with a few homes, reaching the Ohio border. At this point, the road continues west into Ohio as SR 305.

Major intersections

See also

References

External links

Pennsylvania Highways: PA 718

718
Transportation in Mercer County, Pennsylvania